Värmbols FC is a Swedish football club located in Katrineholm in Södermanland County.

Background
In 1990 it was decided to divide Värmbols GoIF into 3 clubs, namely FC Värmbols, DFK Värmbol (Värmbol Women's Football Club) and KVBK (Katrineholm Värmbol Bandyklubb).   Värmbols Football Club was formed on 3 December 1990.

Since their foundation Värmbols FC has participated mainly in the lower divisions of the Swedish football league system including a spell in Division 5 from 2000 to 2002.  The club currently plays in Division 2 Södra Svealand which is the fourth tier of Swedish football. They play their home matches at the Backavallen in Katrineholm.

The club is affiliated to the Södermanlands Fotbollförbund.

Season to season

External links
 Värmbols FC – Official Website

Footnotes

Sport in Södermanland County
Football clubs in Södermanland County
Association football clubs established in 1990
1990 establishments in Sweden